Gilbert Taument (born 14 November 1968 in The Hague) is a Dutch footballer who played for Eerste Divisie club SBV Excelsior during the 1991-1994 football seasons.

References

External links
voetbal international profile

Dutch footballers
Footballers from The Hague
Excelsior Rotterdam players
Eerste Divisie players
1968 births
Living people
Association footballers not categorized by position